Chehlan Wala (also spelled as Chahlan Wal or Chehlanwala) is a village in Sardulgarh tehsil of Mansa district in Punjab, India. The village was on the list for more than 90% of voting in the February 2012 elections.

Geography 

Kamalu, Behniwal and Bana Wala are the surrounding villages.

References 

Villages in Mansa district, India
Villages surrounding Talwandi Sabo Power Plant